Sayyid Taqiuddin Muhammad Bhaakri  was born at Jhunsi in 720 H (1320) AD, district Allahabad, India. and died  on 7th Zul hijja 785 H (31 January 1384)  was also known by his other name Shaykh Taqi, sadar ul haq[later Mugal on page 213] and Ali Akbar. He is a " "Bhaakri sayyid", a direct descendant of Muhammad and was different from other children and kept himself busy in prayer and meditation.
In his early life he gains knowledge of shariyat(Law) and tariqat(path of spirituality) from his father Shaban ul millat Ali Murtaza bayabani. Shaban ul millat was a Sufi of Soharwardi order and a khalifa of Makhdoom Minhajuddin haji harmain .
Sayyid Taqiuddin renounced the world and left for Bukhara what is now Uzbekistan in search of knowledge and higher education and met with sayyid Muhammad Bhakkari bin Abdul haq, he stayed there for 12 years in Bukhara and learned and mastered spirituality from sayyid Muhammad Bhakkari. 
More information can be found in Manba al Ansab 
Sayyid Muhammad Bhakkari had one son (Khwaja Bahauddin Naqshband ) and one daughter he married his daughter to Sayyid Taqiuddin.
In the later stage Shaykh Taqi came back to his home town jhunsi and settled there and started spreading message of Islam. He was very Forgiving and helping for Muslims and non Muslims as well. There were more than thousand non Muslim accepted Islam on his hand. He died at the age of 64 or 65 years and his Shrine was located in Jhunsi (10 km from Allahabad ) where thousands of devotee visits every year,

One of his Khalifa (Haji rumi) Wrote a book(Tahrir al Mutaqid fi halat al murshid) an account of Life history of Shaykh taqi and His Father Ali Murtaza Bayabani.

More Information

 Manba al Ansab Written by Shah Moin ul-haq[Great grand Son of Shyakh Taqi]
 Tahrir al Mutaqid fi halat al murshid Written by Haji Rumi (Khalifa of Shaykh Taqi)

References

Sufis